Stephen Wolfram (born 29 August 1959) is a British-American computer scientist, physicist, and businessman. He is known for his work in computer science, mathematics, and theoretical physics. In 2012, he was named a fellow of the American Mathematical Society. He is currently an adjunct professor at the University of Illinois Department of Computer Science.

As a businessman, he is the founder and CEO of the software company Wolfram Research where he works as chief designer of Mathematica and the Wolfram Alpha answer engine.

Early life

Family
Stephen Wolfram was born in London in 1959 to Hugo and Sybil Wolfram, both German Jewish refugees to the United Kingdom.  His maternal grandmother was British psychoanalyst Kate Friedlander.

Wolfram's father, Hugo Wolfram, was a textile manufacturer and served as managing director of the Lurex Company—makers of the fabric Lurex. Wolfram's mother, Sybil Wolfram, was a Fellow and Tutor in Philosophy at Lady Margaret Hall at University of Oxford from 1964 to 1993.

Stephen Wolfram is married to a mathematician. They have four children together.

Education
Wolfram was educated at Eton College, but left prematurely in 1976. As a young child, Wolfram had difficulties learning arithmetic. He entered St. John's College, Oxford, at age 17 and left in 1978 without graduating to attend the California Institute of Technology the following year, where he received a PhD in particle physics in 1980. Wolfram's thesis committee was composed of Richard Feynman, Peter Goldreich, Frank J. Sciulli and Steven Frautschi, and chaired by Richard D. Field.

Early career
Wolfram, at the age of 15, began research in applied quantum field theory and particle physics and published scientific papers in peer-reviewed scientific journals including Nuclear Physics B, Australian Journal of Physics, Nuovo Cimento, and Physical Review D. Working independently, Wolfram published a widely cited paper on heavy quark production at age 18 and nine other papers. Wolfram's work with Geoffrey C. Fox on the theory of the strong interaction is still used in experimental particle physics.

Following his PhD, Wolfram joined the faculty at Caltech and became the youngest recipient of a MacArthur Fellowship in 1981, at age 21.

Later career

Complex systems and cellular automata 
In 1983, Wolfram left for the School of Natural Sciences of the Institute for Advanced Study in Princeton. By that time, he was no longer interested in particle physics. Instead, he began pursuing investigations into cellular automata, mainly with computer simulations. He produced a series of papers systematically investigating the class of elementary cellular automata, conceiving the Wolfram code, a naming system for one-dimensional cellular automata, and a classification scheme for the complexity of their behaviour. He conjectured that the Rule 110 cellular automaton might be Turing complete, which was later proved correct.  Wolfram's cellular-automata work came to be cited in more than 10,000 papers.

In the mid-1980s, Wolfram worked on simulations of physical processes (such as turbulent fluid flow) with cellular automata on the Connection Machine alongside Richard Feynman and helped initiate the field of complex systems. In 1984, he was a participant in the Founding Workshops of the Santa Fe Institute, along with Nobel laureates Murray Gell-Mann, Manfred Eigen, and Philip Warren Anderson, and future laureate Frank Wilczek. In 1986, he founded the Center for Complex Systems Research (CCSR) at the University of Illinois at Urbana–Champaign. In 1987, he founded the journal Complex Systems.

Symbolic Manipulation Program 

Wolfram led the development of the computer algebra system SMP (Symbolic Manipulation Program) in the Caltech physics department during 1979–1981. A dispute with the administration over the intellectual property rights regarding SMP—patents, copyright, and faculty involvement in commercial ventures—eventually led him to resign from Caltech. SMP was further developed and marketed commercially by Inference Corp. of Los Angeles during 1983–1988.

Mathematica 

In 1986, Wolfram left the Institute for Advanced Study for the University of Illinois at Urbana–Champaign where he founded their Center for Complex Systems Research and started to develop the computer algebra system Mathematica, which was first released on 23 June 1988, when he left academia. In 1987, he founded Wolfram Research which continues to develop and market the program.

A New Kind of Science 

From 1992 to 2002, Wolfram worked on his controversial book A New Kind of Science, which presents an empirical study of simple computational systems. Additionally, it argues that for fundamental reasons these types of systems, rather than traditional mathematics, are needed to model and understand complexity in nature. Wolfram's conclusion is that the universe is discrete in its nature, and runs on fundamental laws which can be described as simple programs. He predicts that a realization of this within scientific communities will have a revolutionary influence on physics, chemistry, biology, and a majority of scientific areas in general, hence the book's title. The book was met with skepticism and criticism that Wolfram took credit for the work of others.

Wolfram Alpha computational knowledge engine 

In March 2009, Wolfram announced Wolfram Alpha, an answer engine. WolframAlpha later launched in May 2009, and a paid-for version with extra features launched in February 2012 that was met with criticism for its high price that was later dropped from $50.00 to $2.00. The engine is based on natural language processing and a large library of algorithms. The application programming interface allows other applications to extend and enhance Wolfram Alpha.

Touchpress 

In 2010, Wolfram co-founded Touchpress along with Theodore Gray, Max Whitby, and John Cromie. The company specialised in creating in-depth premium apps and games covering a wide range of educational subjects designed for children, parents, students, and educators. Since the launch, Touchpress has published more than 100 apps. The company is no longer active.

Wolfram Language 

In March 2014, at the annual South by Southwest (SXSW) event, Wolfram officially announced the Wolfram Language as a new general multi-paradigm programming language, though it was previously available through Mathematica and not an entirely new programming language. The documentation for the language was pre-released in October 2013 to coincide with the bundling of Mathematica and the Wolfram Language on every Raspberry Pi computer with some controversy because of the proprietary nature of the Wolfram Language. While the Wolfram Language has existed for over 30 years as the primary programming language used in Mathematica, it was not officially named until 2014, and is not widely used.

Wolfram Physics Project 

In April 2020, Wolfram announced the "Wolfram Physics Project" as an effort to reduce and explain all the laws of physics within a paradigm of a hypergraph that is transformed by minimal rewriting rules that obey the Church-Rosser property.  The effort is a continuation of the ideas he originally described in A New Kind of Science. Wolfram claims that "From an extremely simple model, we're able to reproduce special relativity, general relativity and the core results of quantum mechanics." Physicists are generally unimpressed with Wolfram's claim, and state that Wolfram's results are non-quantitative and arbitrary.

Personal interests and activities
Wolfram has an extensive log of personal analytics, including emails received and sent, keystrokes made, meetings and events attended, phone calls, even physical movement dating back to the 1980s. In the preface of A New Kind of Science, he noted that he recorded over one-hundred million keystrokes and one-hundred mouse miles. He has stated "[personal analytics] can give us a whole new dimension to experiencing our lives."

Stephen Wolfram was involved as a scientific consultant for the 2016 film Arrival. He and his son Christopher wrote some of the code featured on-screen, such as the code in graphics depicting an analysis of the alien logograms, for which they used the Wolfram Language.

Bibliography
Metamathematics: Foundations & Physicalization, (2022), Wolfram Media, Inc,  ASIN:B0BPN7SHN3 
Combinators: A Centennial View (2021)
 A Project to Find the Fundamental Theory of Physics (2020), Publisher: Wolfram Media, 
Adventures of a Computational Explorer (2019)
Idea Makers: Personal Perspectives on the Lives & Ideas of Some Notable People (2016)
Elementary Introduction to the Wolfram Language (2015)

The Mathematica Book (multiple editions)
Cellular Automata and Complexity: Collected Papers (1994)
Theory and Applications of Cellular Automata (1986)

References

External links

Wolfram Foundation

 
 
 
 
 Wikidata 

1959 births
20th-century American businesspeople
20th-century American mathematicians
20th-century British businesspeople
20th-century British mathematicians
21st-century American businesspeople
21st-century American mathematicians
21st-century British businesspeople
21st-century British mathematicians
American computer programmers
American computer scientists
American people of Hungarian-Jewish descent
American technology chief executives
American technology company founders
American transhumanists
Artificial intelligence researchers
British emigrants to the United States
British Jewish writers
British technology chief executives
British technology company founders
British transhumanists
Life extensionists
Businesspeople in software
California Institute of Technology alumni
Cellular automatists
Chaos theorists
Complex systems scientists
Computational physicists
English computer programmers
English computer scientists
English emigrants to the United States
English Jews
English people of German-Jewish descent
English people of Hungarian-Jewish descent
Fellows of the American Mathematical Society
Graph drawing people
Independent scientists
Information visualization experts
Institute for Advanced Study visiting scholars
Jewish American scientists
Jewish physicists
Living people
MacArthur Fellows
Machine learning researchers
Mathematics writers
Particle physicists
People educated at Eton College
People educated at The Dragon School
Programming language designers
Programming language researchers
Researchers in geometric algorithms
University of Illinois Urbana-Champaign faculty
Wolfram Research people
American systems scientists
British systems scientists
21st-century American Jews